Thomas McNamara may refer to:
 Thomas Francis McNamara (1867–1947), Irish Roman Catholic ecclesiastical architect
 Thomas William McNamara (1926–2020), United States Navy admiral
 Thomas E. McNamara (born 1940), United States diplomat and State Department official
 Tommy McNamara (born 1991), American professional soccer player

See also
 Tom McNamara (disambiguation)
 Thomas Macnamara (1861–1931), British teacher, educationalist and Liberal politician